Rapública (partly known as Rapublic, Portuguese for "Rapublic" a combination of the words "rap" and "republic") was the first compilation of Portuguese rap music released by several artists including Boss AC, Black Company, Zona Dread, Family and Líderes da Nova Mensagem.

Importance
This album knew Portugal a different music which for many were still unknown, rap and hip hop, "Nadar" of Black Company, one of the music with that compilation, started to air on Portuguese radio stations, eventually  becoming a great success.  Other successful tracks from the album  included "Rap é uma potência" by LNM, "Rabola pô Corpo" by Family, many were heard in discotheques and the energetic 'Generate Power" from Boss AC, Rapública brought to become a silver disc, it went to sell 15,000 copies in its first years.  One of the most sold albums in Portuguese rap (including those made in Portugal).  Although most of the bands and groups no longer exists today and made a pioneering role in its great importance broadening its horizons of the national music level.

Influence and styles
Although, it centered the start of the rap-hip hop generations and notes a different strength of style with different songs.  It verifies having which its influential styles of each group.

In English
Made up of rappers that came from the South Margin (mecca of national hip hop), its main influence is from Black Company, which is in English, it also featured with other groups including New Tribe and Boss AC. Boss AC and Black Company only recorded two songs each, entirely in English including "Generate Power" and "Psycha Style".  Still, it is possible it opened English speaking rhythms in other songs sung also in Portuguese including "A verdade" and "Summer Season".

In Creole
Family which composed of MCs including Melo D, only to record a number one hip hop rhythmic track in creole titled "Rabola Bô Corpo".  The track was having its African rhythmic influences with reggae, and did the African collection with Family.

RagaMuffin
Once recorded in the 1990s, it was only natural that artists with a new hip hop style, it started as ragamuffin, it had strong influences on young artists.  The most notorious tracks were made by Faminly and Boss AC with purely ragga songs named "Generate Power".

Politics
It felt the rap with music styles, more political, having Rapública necessities to oppose messages with the most lame and social.  Two most political groups, emphasizes Zona Dread, author of a political song "Só Queremos ser Iguais" ("A strong picture of hate in Portugal"), Boss AC with the song "A verdade" and Funky D with the song "Minha Banda" (reference to a warlike situation that once occurred in Angola).

Fell-Good Vibe
Another perspective presented in the album and the rep "Fell Good", it registered as "squeaky clean".  The next field which emphasized the New Tribe with the song "Summer Season" and Black Company with Nadar (both related to the summer)

P&P (Poesia e Profundidade)
Under the lyrical register which founded, with the song "Se tu mesmo, directed towards the listener's personality.  Along with the New Tribe, it

Track listing

See also
Hip hop Tuga

References

1994 compilation albums
Boss AC albums
Hip hop albums by Portuguese artists